Ray of light is an abstract model of light used in optics.

Ray of light may also refer to:
 Light beam, a narrow beam of light
 Crepuscular rays, rays of sunlight

Music
 Ray of Light, a 1998 album by Madonna
 "Ray of Light" (song)
 Ray of Light, a 2002 album by Michael Wong
 Ray of Light, a 2014 album by Tina Guo
 "Rays of Light", a 2014 single by Broiler

Other uses
 A Ray of Light, a 1960 Spanish musical film starring Marisol
 The Ray of Light, painting in the Louvre, Paris
 Ray of Light (sculpture), a public artwork in Redwood City, California
 Ray of Light Theatre
 Ray of Light Foundation, an American non-profit organization

See also 
 
 
 Sunray (disambiguation)